The Ak 4 (Swedish: Automatkarbin 4) is a Swedish-made version of the Heckler & Koch G3A3 battle rifle. It has been produced in several versions, with minor changes and upgrades.

The original Ak 4 model (Ak 4A) featured a buttstock that is  longer. The bolt carrier had a serrated thumb groove to aid in silent bolt closure and was fitted with a heavy buffer for higher number of rounds fired before failure. The Ak 4 iron sights feature extended  sight adjustments in  increments, because the  hit probability met Swedish military doctrine. All Ak 4s are adapted to mount the M203 grenade launcher. Later versions have featured various new optics and adjustable stocks.

The Ak 4 rifles were manufactured from 1965 to 1970 by both Carl Gustafs Stads Gevärsfaktori in Eskilstuna and Husqvarna Vapenfabrik in Huskvarna. From 1970 until the end of production in 1985, they were exclusively produced in Eskilstuna. 

From 1965 to 1985 the Ak 4 was the standard service rifle of the Swedish military. It continues to be in use by the Swedish Home Guard and in specialist marksman roles in the regular armed forces.

History
The Ak 4 replaced the Automatgevär m/42 rifle and Carl Gustaf m/45 submachine gun in the 1960s. In order to replace the old weapons, Sweden held a trial of new weapons including: the Belgian FN FAL, the Swiss SIG SG 510, the Swedish Carl Gustaf GRAM 63, the American M14 and the German Heckler & Koch G3. After several different types of testing the FN FAL and Heckler & Koch G3 passed the tests. Due to its durability and lower price due to modern production methods the Ak 4 version of the Heckler & Koch G3 was selected as the new standard rifle in 1964. Sweden and Heckler & Koch agreed a 15,000 round service life.

From 1965 to 1970 the Ak 4 was produced by Husqvarna and later changed to Carl Gustaf in Eskilstuna in 1970 until it was replaced by the 5.56×45mm NATO chambered Ak 5 (a version of the Belgian FN FNC), but the Ak 4 is still used in the Hemvärnet-Nationella skyddsstyrkorna (Swedish Home Guard). Sweden has supplied unmodified Ak 4s to Estonia, Latvia and Lithuania. In 1985 the Ak 4 was replaced by the Ak 5.

Variants
 Ak 4: Swedish-made version of the G3A3.
 Ak 4OR: Optiskt Riktmedel, optical sight. This model is fitted with a Hensoldt Fero Z24 4×24 telescopic sight mounted via a HK claw mount. During a few years it was not issued but it is now again in use by the Hemvärnet - Nationella skyddsstyrkorna (Swedish Home Guard). The Hensoldt Fero Z24 4×24 telescopic sight for G3 rifle and STANAG claw mount assembly were developed for designated marksman use.
 Ak 4B: In this updated version the iron sights have been removed and replaced with an Aimpoint CS red-dot reflex sight mounted on a Picatinny rail (MIL-STD-1913). The rail is welded onto the rifle. Used by Hemvärnet - Nationella skyddsstyrkorna (Swedish Home Guard).'
 Ak 4C: An updated version of the Ak 4B with a 6-position adjustable-length buttstock with a cheek support comb optimized for aiming optics use designed and manufactured by the Swedish company Spuhr i Dalby AB. 5,000 Ak 4C began being fielded in 2017 by Hemvärnet - Nationella skyddsstyrkorna ("Swedish Home Guard").
 Ak 4D: An updated version of the Ak 4B with the adjustable-length buttstock of the Ak 4C but with the addition of a modular fore-end (also designed and manufactured by the Swedish company Spuhr i Dalby AB), a bipod and the Hensoldt Fero Z24 4×24 telescopic sight of the Ak 4OR mounted on a Picatinny rail (MIL-STD-1913). 400 Ak 4D will be used by the Swedish Army as a stop-gap designated marksman rifle (DMR).

Users

 - Estonian Defence League uses the Ak4 variant.

 - Ak4 variant used by National Guard.
 - Ak4 variant was used by the Lithuanian Armed Forces. and Lithuanian National Defence Volunteer Forces.
 - Made by three manufacturers, Heckler & Koch in Germany, and under license by Husqvarna Vapenfabrik (1965–70) and Carl Gustaf Gevärsfaktori (1965–80) which was later renamed to Förenade Fabriksverken (FFV) as the Ak 4 (Automatkarbin 4). Two sub-variants are known to exist, one equipped with a rail and Aimpoint sight (Ak4 B) and the other with a 4× magnifying optic, the Hensoldt Fero Z24 4×24 (Ak 4OR). It has since been replaced by the Ak 5 (Automatkarbin 5; a modified version of the FN FNC) in the regular army. Ak 4B and Ak 4OR, some times in combination with the M203 grenade launcher, is still in use in Hemvärnet – Nationella skyddsstyrkorna, the Swedish Home Guard. About 5,000 units received a new adjustable stock from 2016. An additional 5,000 units were ordered in 2019. In December 2020, the in-house review, Tidningen Hemvärnet, announced that 1,000 extra units had been ordered, meaning every soldier in the Home Guard would receive the new adjustable stock AK4C variant before the end of 2022.

Gallery

See also

CETME
HK G3
FN FAL
SIG SG 510
M14 rifle
Ak 5

References

7.62×51mm NATO battle rifles
Rifles of Sweden